Lyman Ward (born June 21, 1941) is a Canadian actor best known for his roles in Creature (1984), Ferris Bueller's Day Off (1986), and Milk and Honey (1988).

Life and career
Ward was born and raised in Saint John, New Brunswick and graduated from St. Malachy's Memorial High School in the class of 1959, and then in 1963 from St. Thomas University which was located at the time in Miramichi, New Brunswick before relocating to Fredericton in 1964.

He appeared on the first episode of Laverne & Shirley as Tad Schotz, but is most noted for playing Ferris Bueller's father in Ferris Bueller's Day Off (1986). In 1990, Ward was cast as Jim Walsh in the pilot of the show Beverly Hills, 90210. Producers later recast the role and his scenes were cut and reshot with James Eckhouse. In 2001, he made a cameo appearance in the movie Not Another Teen Movie as Mr. Wyler, spoofing his role in Ferris Bueller's Day Off. Ward also played a minor role in Planes, Trains and Automobiles (1987) as John, one of the marketers.

Lyman Ward and Second City actor Sandra Bogan lived together in 1985. Ward met Cindy Pickett on the set of Ferris Bueller, where they played the parents of the teenage protagonist in the 1986 film. They married in real life, had two children together, then divorced shortly after playing the parents of the teenage protagonist in the 1992 film Sleepwalkers.

Ward published a novel titled Fortune's Tide in 2016, a historical fiction based in his home town of Saint John.

He continues to act in both films and television.

Filmography

Coffy (1973) - Orderly
One Day at a Time (Season 1 Episode 2) (1975) - Steve Blanchard
The Great Smokey Roadblock (1977) - Leland
Alice (1978) episode 6 Season 3 as Burt Gilman (a date of Alice's) 
Battlestar Galactica (1979) - Karibdis
The Happy Hooker Goes Hollywood (1980) - Real Estate Agent
Barney Miller (1980 episode "Agent Orange" as Len Macready, 1982 episode "Examination Day" as Harv Jetter)
Whose Life Is It Anyway? (1981) - Emergency Room Doctor
Love Letters (1983) - Morgan Crawford
Moscow on the Hudson (1984) - Agent Williams
Young Lust (1984)
Protocol (1984) - Senator Kenworthy
Creature (1985) - David Perkins
A Nightmare on Elm Street 2: Freddy's Revenge (1985) - Mr. Grady
Ferris Bueller's Day Off (1986) - Tom Bueller
Planes, Trains and Automobiles (1987) - John (uncredited)
Perfect Victims (1988) - Steven Hack
Milk and Honey (1988) - Adam Bernardi
She's Having a Baby (1988) - Himself (uncredited)
Riding the Edge (1989) - John
Best Shots (1990) - Roger Boro
Murder She Wrote (1991) - Mitchell Lawrence
Guilty as Charged (1991) - Stanford
The Taking of Beverly Hills (1991) - Chief Healy
Mikey (1992) - Mr. Jenkins
Sleepwalkers (1992) - Mr. Robertson
The Beverly Hillbillies (1993) - Chief Gallo
No Dessert, Dad, Till You Mow the Lawn (1994) - Larry
The Wrong Woman (1995) - Jonah Slide
Independence Day (1996) - Secret Service Agent
The Secret Agent Club (1996) - SHADOW General
Not Another Teen Movie (2001) - Mr. Wyler
Quiet Kill (2004) - Dr. Rubin
Rumor Has It (2005) - Charity Dinner Guests
Two:Thirteen (2009) - Police Captain
Farah Goes Bang (2013) - Walter
Transparent (2015) - Dean Carl Spitzer
In the Forest (2022) - Stan (Grandpa)

References

External links

1941 births
20th-century Canadian male actors
21st-century Canadian male actors
Canadian male film actors
Canadian male television actors
Canadian male voice actors
Living people
People from Saint John, New Brunswick
Male actors from New Brunswick
St. Thomas University (New Brunswick) alumni